William Axt (April 19, 1888 – February 13, 1959) was an American composer of nearly two hundred film scores.

Life and career
Born in New York City, Axt graduated from DeWitt Clinton High School in The Bronx and studied at the National Conservatory of Music of America. He earned a Doctor of Musical Arts degree from the University of Chicago in 1922. He studied in Berlin under Xaver Scharwenka.

Axt made his American debut as a conductor on December 28, 1910.

He served as an assistant conductor for the Hammerstein Grand Opera Company and was a musical director for the Capitol Theatre in Manhattan before joining the music department at Metro-Goldwyn-Mayer in 1929.

Axt retired from the film industry to raise cattle and breed horses in Laytonville, California. He died in Ukiah, California, and had at least one son (Edward).

Selected filmography

 Theodora (1921; with Erno Rapee)
 The Prisoner of Zenda (1922)
 Greed (1924)
 The Big Parade (1925; with David Mendoza)
 Ben-Hur (1925; with David Mendoza)
 The Merry Widow (1925)
 La Bohème (1926)
 Don Juan (1926; with David Mendoza)
 The Scarlet Letter (1926)
 Camille (1927)
 The Student Prince in Old Heidelberg (1927; with David Mendoza)
 Our Dancing Daughters (1928)
 Show People (1928)
 The Trail of '98 (1928)
 White Shadows in the South Seas (1928)
 A Woman of Affairs (1928)
 The Duke Steps Out (1929)
 The Flying Fleet (1929)
 The Kiss (1929)
 The Last of Mrs. Cheyney (1929)
 Madame X (1929)
 Our Modern Maidens (1929)
 Where East Is East (1929)
 A Free Soul (1931)
 Private Lives (1931)
 Susan Lenox (Her Fall and Rise) (1931)
 Faithless (1932)
 Grand Hotel (1932)
 The Mask of Fu Manchu (1932)
 The Washington Masquerade (1932)
 The Wet Parade(1932)
 Broadway to Hollywood (1933)
 Clear All Wires! (1933)
 Dinner at Eight (1933)
 Eskimo (1933)
 Gabriel Over the White House (1933)
 Hell Below (1933)
 Penthouse (1933)
 The Secret of Madame Blanche (1933)
 Sons of the Desert (1933)
 Storm at Daybreak (1933)
 Reunion in Vienna (1933)
 Forsaking All Others (1934)
 Manhattan Melodrama (1934)
 Men in White (1934)
 Operator 13 (1934)
 Sadie McKee (1934)
 The Thin Man (1934)
 Tarzan and His Mate (1934)
 A Wicked Woman (1934)
 You Can't Buy Everything (1934)
 Buried Loot (1935), short
 Rendezvous (1935)
 David Copperfield (1935)
 Libeled Lady (1936)
 Tarzan Escapes (1936)
 We Went to College (1936)
 Beg, Borrow or Steal (1937)
 London by Night (1937)
 Parnell (1937)
 Under Cover of Night (1937)
 Everybody Sing (1938)
 Woman Against Woman (1938)
 Yellow Jack (1938)
 Sergeant Madden (1939)
 Tarzan Finds a Son! (1939)
 Tell No Tales (1939)
 Untamed (1940)
 Little Nellie Kelly (1940)
 Tarzan's Secret Treasure (1941)
 Madame Curie (1943)

References

External links

American film score composers
American male film score composers
American male conductors (music)
Musicians from New York City
1888 births
1959 deaths
DeWitt Clinton High School alumni
University of Chicago alumni
People from Laytonville, California
Classical musicians from New York (state)
20th-century American conductors (music)
20th-century American male musicians